Law of the Panhandle is a 1950 American Western film directed by Lewis D. Collins and starring Johnny Mack Brown, Jane Adams and Riley Hill.

Plot

Cast
Johnny Mack Brown as U.S. Marshal Johnny Mack Brown 
Jane Adams as Margie Kendal 
Riley Hill as Sheriff Tom 
Marshall Reed as Ed Rance 
Myron Healey as Henry Faulkner 
Ted Adams as Fred Kendal 
Lee Roberts as Henchman Judd 
Carol Henry as Henchman Ace 
Milburn Morante as Telegrapher Ezra 
Kermit Maynard as Luke Winslow 
Bob Duncan as Evans

References

External links

1950 Western (genre) films
American Western (genre) films
Films directed by Lewis D. Collins
Monogram Pictures films
American black-and-white films
Films with screenplays by Joseph F. Poland
1950s English-language films
1950s American films